Carrick is an Anglicised version of creag/carraig, Gaelic for "rock", and may refer to:

People 
Carrick (surname)
 Donnchadh, Earl of Carrick (died 1250), Scottish Mormaer and first Earl of Carrick
 Marjorie of Carrick (1256–1292), mother of Robert the Bruce and Countess of Carrick
 Niall of Carrick (died 1256), Scottish Mormaer and second Earl of Carrick

Places

Australia 
 Carrick, New South Wales
 Carrick, Tasmania

Canada 
 Carrick, Ontario, part of South Bruce, Ontario since 1999
 Carrick, Manitoba, a community within the Rural Municipality of Piney

Ireland 
 Carrick, County Donegal
 Carrick, County Kildare, a civil parish in County Kildare
 Carrick, County Westmeath (civil parish), a civil parish in the barony of Fartullagh, County Westmeath
 Carrick, Fartullagh, a townland in the civil parish of Carrick, barony of Fartullagh, County Westmeath
 Carrick, Lackan, a townland in the civil parish of Lackan, barony of Corkaree, County Westmeath
 Carrick, Noughaval, a townland in the civil parish of Noughaval, barony of Kilkenny West, County Westmeath
 Carrick, St Mary's, a townland in the civil parish of St Mary's, barony of Fore, County Westmeath
 Carrick Mountain, a mountain in Wicklow

United Kingdom 
 Carrick, Cornwall, a former local government district
 Carrick Heaths, a Site of Special Scientific Interest in Cornwall
 Carrick Roads, a waterway in Cornwall
 Carrick, Scotland
 Carrick Castle (village) in Argyll and Bute, Scotland
 Carrick, County Armagh, a townland in County Armagh, Northern Ireland
 Carrick, County Fermanagh, a townland in County Fermanagh, Northern Ireland
 Carrick, County Londonderry, a civil parish and townland in County Londonderry, Northern Ireland
 Carrick, County Tyrone, a townland in County Tyrone, Northern Ireland
 Carrick (Northern Ireland Parliament constituency)

United States 
 Carrick, California
 Carrick (Pittsburgh), Pennsylvania

Titles 
 Earl of Carrick, title of a medieval Scottish provincial ruler
 Earl of Carrick (Ireland), title in the peerage of Ireland

Other uses 
 City of Adelaide (1864), also known as HMS Carrick, a clipper ship
 Carrick bend, a knot
 Carrick Church, located in County Fermanagh, Northern Ireland
 Carrack-class light cruiser, a fictional ship class in Star Wars video games

See also
 Carrick-on-Suir, Ireland
 Carrick-on-Shannon, Ireland
 Carrack, a type of mediaeval sailing ship